The Mercedes-Benz O404 was both a complete coach and a coach chassis manufactured by Mercedes-Benz between 1992 and 1999. As a complete coach it was available in three lengths (O404-10, O404-13 and O404-15) and three different heights (RH, RHD and SHD). As a chassis it was available both with two and three axles.

Israeli bus operator Egged was the first corporation to use the O404 to carry passengers, as opposed to tours operation.

History
The Mercedes-Benz O404 was launched in 1992 as a replacement for the  O303.

It was superseded by the Mercedes-Benz OC500RF as a chassis, known in Australia as the Mercedes-Benz O500RF, and the Mercedes-Benz Travego as a complete coach in 1999.

References

External links

O404
Vehicles introduced in 1992
Coaches (bus)